Tuhina Das is an Indian Bengali model and actress.

Career
Das grew up in a middle class family of Contai and moved to Kolkata to study fashion. Once in Kolkata, she became active in the theatre scene, and has since pursued an acting career. Her breakthrough movie was Gharey Bairey Aaj by Aparna Sen, for which she won the West Bengal Film Journalists' Association's Most Promising Actress award. Das got a breakthrough for her title role in Bengali web series Damayanti. Since then, she has appeared in several feature films and web series, making her Hindi-language debut in 2021.

References

External links

Indian actresses
Living people
Year of birth missing (living people)
People from Purba Medinipur district
Bengali actresses